James Wilson (born 25 February 1972) is an English darts player who plays in the Professional Darts Corporation.

Career

BDO
Wilson first rose to prominence in 2012 by winning several tournaments, rising to number four in the world and reaching the quarter-finals of the Winmau World Masters. Despite this, he was unseeded on his debut appearance at the World Championship and was drawn against top seed Stephen Bunting in round one, taking a 2–1 lead before eventually losing 2–3. Wilson followed up on his form in 2013, rising to second in the world and reaching the final of the World Masters beating Jan Dekker and Robbie Green en route to a 7–0 loss to Bunting. Later that year Wilson demolished Bunting 5–1 in the final of the Zuiderduin Masters. Wilson therefore entered the World Championship as the second seed, and beat former world champion Christian Kist in the first round then Scott Mitchell in the second round, to set up a quarter-final against Alan Norris, which Norris won 5–2 despite Wilson averaging 99.06, hitting three 11 dart legs (one of which included a bounce-out) and 14 180s.

In February 2014, Wilson found himself as de facto number one after Stephen Bunting's change-over to the rival Professional Darts Corporation. He subsequently won his first major at the inaugural BDO World Trophy. Wins over Richie George, Rick Hofstra, Jeffrey de Graaf and Paul Jennings saw Wilson progress to the final where he defeated Ross Montgomery 13–11 for a winner's cheque of £30,000.

Wilson entered the 2014 World Masters as the number one seed but suffered a shock first round exit, losing 3-0 in sets to Mark McGeeney. He also entered the 2015 BDO World Darts Championship as the number one seed but also lost in the first round to Sweden's Peter Sajwani.

PDC
The day after being knocked out of the 2015 BDO World Championship, Wilson announced on his Twitter page that he had signed up to the Professional Darts Corporation's Qualifying School with the intention of earning a tour card. On the third of four qualifying days Wilson won a two-year membership with the PDC by beating Nathan Aspinall 5–2 in the final round. Wilson's first PDC major was the UK Open and he beat Mark Frost 5–0 and Ricky Evans 9–4 to reach the fourth round, where he lost 9–7 against Kyle Anderson. In May he knocked out Steve Brown, Michael Smith, Jamie Lewis and Darren Johnson at the ninth Players Championship event of the year to reach his first PDC quarter-final and was defeated 6–3 by Gary Anderson. Wilson qualified for three European Tour events during the year, but was eliminated in the second round of each.

In 2016, Wilson lost to Kyle Anderson in the fourth round of the UK Open for the second year in a row, this time 9–2. Later in the year he reached the semi-finals of three successive Pro Tour events, before his first PDC final arrived at the 15th Players Championship event with wins over Steve Hine, James Richardson, Steve West, Vincent van der Voort, Raymond van Barneveld and Jermaine Wattimena. From 3–3, world number one Michael van Gerwen moved away to defeat Wilson 6–3. The pair met in the second round of the World Grand Prix with Van Gerwen winning 3–0 in sets. At the European Championship, Wilson beat Kim Huybrechts 6–3 and Mervyn King 10–9 to play in his first major PDC quarter-final, which he lost 10–7 to James Wade. He won a place at the Grand Slam of Darts through the qualifier and saw off Dave Chisnall 5–2 in his opening game, before losing 5–3 to Wade. He needed a win over Jamie Hughes to progress to the knockout stage and led 4–2, but went on to lose 5–4. Wilson also played in the Players Championship Finals for the first time after finishing 11th on the Order of Merit, but was knocked out 6–2 by Vincent Kamphuis in the first round.

Wilson topped the Pro Tour Order of Merit for non-qualified players to qualify for the 2017 World Championship. In his first appearance at the event he lost 3–0 to Kim Huybrechts in the opening round. He played 4 other major tournaments in 2017, namely 2nd round of UK Open 2017, and was eliminated in 1st rounds of World Matchplay 2017 and Players Championship Finals 2017. For the second time in a row, he qualified for Grand Slam of Darts, but was unable to make it through the round robin. Towards the end of the year Wilson broke into top 32 of PDC Order of Merit and qualified as 32nd seed for the PDC World Darts Championship 2018. 

Wilson faced Krzysztof Ratajski in the first round of PDC World Darts Championship 2018 and won 3-1 on sets. In the second round he lost 0-4 to the world number one, Michael van Gerwen. In 2018 Wilson continued in his progress in PDC and settled himself comfortably in top 32 of PDC Order of Merit. He lost again in the 2nd round of UK Open 2018, as well as the first round of World Matchplay 2018. His best tournament of the year came at the World Grand Prix 2018, where he reached the second quarterfinal on major in his PDC career. He defeated former major title winners, Simon Whitlock (2-1 on sets) in the first round and the former World Champion, Adrian Lewis (3-2) in the second round. He lost in the quarterfinal to Peter Wright 2-3 in a very tight match. After a year break he later qualified for European Championship 2018 and defeated Jonny Clayton in the first round, losing to Max Hopp in the second round. Wilson did not qualify for Grand Slam of Darts but for the first time in his career, he made it to the second round of Players Championship Finals, after win over Dimitri van den Bergh. During the year Wilson changed back his nickname from "Lethal Biscuit" to "Jammy Dodger".

He entered the PDC World Darts Championship 2019 as 26th seed and in the new format, he started in the second round. He faced William O'Connor and lost 2-3 on sets. At the UK Open 2019 Wilson received bye to the 4th round, where he scored only one leg in a match against James Wade and lost 1-10. Wilson's form dropped down during the year and the only other major he played in was Players Championship Finals 2019, where he caused major surprise after winning 6-5 over the 4th seed, Peter Wright. In the second round Wilson was whitewashed by Chris Dobey.   

Despite falling out of top 32 in the PDC Order of Merit, Wilson qualified for PDC World Darts Championship 2020 through PDC Prot Tour Order of Merit, from 27th place. In the first round he lost to Nico Kurz 1-3 on sets. Wilson received bye into the 3rd round of UK Open 2020 and won over Ted Evetts 6-4, before losing to 4-10 to Michael Smith. James struggled during the year, having problems with both shoulder and eye injury. He was unable to qualify for any other major tournament that year and also failed to qualify for PDC World Darts Championship 2021. That caused him major fall down in the rankings and he ended the year on 64th position of PDC Order of Merit, maintaining his Tour card.

Wilson received bye to the 3rd round of UK Open 2021, where he lost 1-6 to Keegan Brown, averaging 80.88. Yet again, he was unable to qualify for any other major tournaments and was constantly dropping down the rankings. In November he won PDPA Qualifier for PDC World Darts Championship 2022 and kept a theoretical chance to hold his Tour card. After losing 1-3 against Luke Woodhouse in the 1st round, Wilson ended the year on 91st place of PDC Order of Merit and lost the Tour card.

In January 2022 Wilson entered PDC UK Q-School and automatically qualified for Final Stage. On the first day of the tournament, he regained his Tour card for 2 years after a win over Cameron Menzies 6-1.

World Championship results

BDO

 2013: First round (lost to Stephen Bunting 2–3)
 2014: Quarter-finals (lost to Alan Norris 2–5)
 2015: First round (lost to Peter Sajwani 1–3)

PDC
 2017: First round (lost to Kim Huybrechts 0–3)
 2018: Second round (lost to Michael van Gerwen 0–4)
 2019: Second round (lost to William O'Connor 2–3)
 2020: First round (lost to Nico Kurz 1–3)
 2022: First round (lost to Luke Woodhouse 1–3)

Career finals

BDO major finals: 3 (2 titles, 1 runner-up)

PDC European tour finals: (1 runner-up)

Performance timeline

BDO

PDC

 

PDC European Tour

External links
 James Wilson's official website

References

1972 births
English darts players
Living people
British Darts Organisation players
Professional Darts Corporation current tour card holders